Druga plovidba (trans. The Second Sail) is the second studio album from Serbian and former Yugoslav rock band Galija.

Druga plovidba is the first album recorded with Predrag Milosavljević as the official band member, although he appeared on the band's previous album, Prva plovidba.

Track listing
All the music was written by Nenad Milosavljević. All the lyrics were written by Predrag Milosavljević, except where noted.
"Oni bi baš hteli da ja stanem" – 3:54
"Moj deda je bio roker" – 4:18
"Bilo je to jednom" – 6:22
"Zar moram baš nešto mudro da kažem" – 3:18
"Nije ti otac kriv" - 3:54
"Neka bude sve tebi u čast" – 5:54
"U suton" (Dobriša Cesarić) – 5:30

Personnel
Nenad Milosavljević - vocals, acoustic guitar, harmonica
Predrag Milosavljević - vocals
Dušan Radivojević - guitar
Zoran Radosavljević - bass guitar
Nebojša Marković - keyboards
Boban Pavlović - drums

References 
 EX YU ROCK enciklopedija 1960-2006,  Janjatović Petar;  

Galija albums
1980 albums
PGP-RTB albums